Libyan Navy is the branch of the Libyan military responsible for naval warfare. Established in November 1962, Libyan Navy has been headed by Admiral Mansour Bader, Chief of Staff of the Libyan Naval Force. Before the Libyan Civil War it was a fairly typical small navy with a few missile frigates, corvettes and patrol boats to defend the coastline, but with a very limited self-defence capability. The Navy has always been the smallest of Libya's services and has always been dependent on foreign sources for equipment, spare parts, and training. Most of the Gaddafi era fleet was destroyed in 2011. Since the start of the ongoing internal conflict, the Libyan Navy is aligned with the Government of National Accord (GNA), led by the Presidential Council in Tripoli, apart from coastal patrol vessels under the control of the Libyan National Army.

History

Its first warship was delivered in 1966. These were two s from the UK. Initially the effective force was limited to smaller vessels, but this changed after the rise of Colonel Muammar Gaddafi in 1969. From this time, Libya started to buy armaments from Europe and the Soviet Union. The Customs and Harbour police were amalgamated with the Navy in 1970, extending the Navy's mission to include anti-smuggling and customs duties. The total personnel of the Libyan Navy is about 8,000.

During the 2011 Libyan civil war several elements of the Libyan Navy were destroyed by NATO forces, including eight warships in the night before 20 May and one on 17 August. Two were also captured by the rebels at Benghazi.

The Navy began the process of purchasing new boats in May 2012, mainly fast patrol boats for surveillance and border protection purposes, including the MRTP-20 fast attack boat.

As of June 2012, the Libyan Navy has been headed by Commodore Hassan Ali Bushnak, Chief of Staff of the Libyan Naval Force. The British Royal Navy along with the Libyan Navy held joint exercises together at Dartmouth Naval College in the UK in June 2012.

Libyan Navy ships under the command of Rida Issa, loyal to the internationally recognized Government of National Accord, took part in the operation to liberate the city of Sirte from ISIL. The Libyan Navy assisted ground forces and blocked off sea escape routes for the militants. On 20 June 2016, the European Union states announced that the naval mission in the Mediterranean Sea, Operation Sophia, was extended until 2017, and helped train the Libyan Navy and coast guard.

In 2021, the navy (except for the Haftar's forces) will be under new leadership of the new Libyan President, Mohamed al-Menfi from the Government of National Unity.

Background 
The Navy's primary mission is to defend the coast. A strengthening of the service was made in the 1970s; the Soviet Union sold six s, and though two of them were only averagely serviceable, they became the main threats to the United States Navy in the Mediterranean Sea. In the meantime, Libya bought four Russian s, that even in the export versions were well-armed and powerful ships. Another four s were acquired from Italy. These had Otomat long range missiles (in the Mk.I version without datalink for in-flight course correction) and modern artillery. They were less well-armed as anti-aircraft ships than the Nanuchkas but, with a displacement almost twice that of a typical fast attack craft, had anti-submarine warfare (ASW) capabilities, with sonar and light torpedoes.

Actions 

Libya's Navy first saw military action during an encounter with the United States Sixth Fleet in March 1986 in the Action in the Gulf of Sidra, when one missile boat and a corvette were destroyed, and other ships were damaged by A-6 Intruder aircraft. Unusually, some of these attacks were performed successfully, with cluster bombs like the Mk.20 Rockeye which were designed as an anti-tank weapon.

In July 1984, the roll-on/roll-off ferry Ghat is believed to have mined the Red Sea a few kilometres south of the Suez Canal. Approximately nineteen ships were damaged, including a Soviet container ship which was the first to be hit on 9 July. The Islamic Jihad Organisation took responsibility for the incident. However, Egypt's President Hosni Mubarak did not believe the claims and blamed Muammar Gaddafi and Libya. Other sources agreed after it was learnt that the ship took fifteen days to complete a voyage that normally would take eight days, the head of the Libyan minelaying division was on board, and that, when inspected by French officials in Marseilles the aft door was damaged.  Due to concerns about the safety and potential lost revenue from the canal, Egypt asked for assistance in sweeping the mines in a complex operation that involved minehunters from the French, British, Italian, Dutch, and US navies. The British located a Soviet-made mine, which was most likely sold to Libya after 1981 and was laid to cause problems for Egypt.

Second Battle of Zawiya. Ships (1985)

Active ships

Former ships

Submarine

6 × Foxtrot-class submarine (1 left; not in commission)

Armament
10 × torpedo tubes (6 bow, 4 stern)
22 × torpedo

Origin: 

In 1982 Libya received six Foxtrot-class submarines from the Soviet Union. However, since 1984, no submarine patrols are reported to have been conducted. In 1993 one submarine was reported sunk, and another one was abandoned in Lithuania due to international sanctions. Further reports circulated about one submarine being refitted in 2003, but they have since turned out to be false. In 2011, during the Libyan civil war, one submarine (along with a frigate and a corvette) was captured by the rebels at the Benghazi naval base.

Frigate
1 × Vosper Mk.7 frigate :(scrapped in 1990)

Armament
1 × 114 mm Mk.8 gun
2 × 40 mm/70 AA guns
2 × 35 mm/90 Oerlikon (this system was remounted on a truck during the Civil War)
2 × Seacat SSMs (Removed)
1 × quad Aspide SAM launcher
 4 × single Otomat AShM launchers
1 × Limbo Mk.10 ASW mortar
 2 × triple  ASW torpedo tubes

Origin: 

1 ×  (Type 1159)
 213 Al Ghardabia: (struck by NATO in Tripoli Harbour 20 May 2011)

Armament:
4 × SS-N-2C Styx SSMs
2 × SA-N-4 SAMs
4 × 76mm guns
4 × 30mm guns
4 × 406mm torpedoes
1 × RBU-6000 A/S mortar
20 mines

Origin:

Corvette

4 × Assad-class corvette
 Al Tadjier: (Destroyed by US Navy aircraft)
 Al Tougour: (Scrapped in 1993)
 Al Kalij: (Scrapped in 1993)
 Al Hudud: ( Scrapped in 1993)

Armament 
1 ×  Otobreda 76 mm gun
2 × 40 mm Breda Dardo guns
2 × 35mm Oerlikon cannon 
4 × Albatros Selenia Aspide SAMs
6 × Otomat anti-ship missiles
6 × ASW torpedo tubes

Origin: 

3 × Nanuchka-class corvette
 Ain Zaara:  (hit by the RAF, 20 May 2011)
 Ain al Gazala: (Damaged 25 March 1986, Decommissioned)
 Ain Zaquit: (sunk by US Navy in 1985)

Armament
4 × SS-N-2C Styx SSMs
2 × SA-N-4 SAMs
2 × 57mm guns MFBPs

Origin:

Fast attack crafts
12 × Osa-class missile boat: (unknown fate)

Armament
4 × 30 mm guns
4 × P-15 Termit (SS-N-2 Styx) AShMs

Origin: 

Some of Jaguar-class fast attack craft: (unknown fate)

Armament
16 × SS-12 missiles
2 × 40 mm guns

Origin: 

9 × La Combattante IIa (Beir Grassa class)

518 Sharara (ex-Beir Grassa): (Non-operational in 2011)
522 Shehab (ex-Beir Gzir): (Damage in May 2011 and abandoned)
524 Wahag (ex-Beir Gitfa):(Damage in May 2011 and abandoned)
526 Waheed (ex-Beir Glulud): (sunk on 24 March 1986 )
528 Shouaiai (ex-Beir Algandula): (Damage in May 2011 and abandoned)
532 Shoula (ex-Beir Ktitat): (Damage in May 2011 and abandoned)
536 Bark (ex-Beir Alkardmen): (Non-operational in 2011)
538 Rad (ex-Beir Alkur): (Damage in May 2011 and abandoned)
542 Laheeb (ex-Beir Alkuesat): (Damage in May 2011 and abandoned)

Armament
4 × (2×2) Otomat MkI SSMs
1 × Oto Melara 76mm gun
1 × Bofors twin 40mm

Origin:

Minesweepers
6 × Natya-class minesweeper (Type 266ME)

Armament
4 × 30mm guns
4 × 25mm guns
4 × 25mm guns
10 mines
Acoustic & Magnetic sweep

Origin: 

2 × Ham-class minesweeper
 Zuara: (sold to Malta in 1973)
 Brak: (broken up in 1973)

Armament
1 × Bofors 40mm gun
1 × Oerlikon 20mm gun

Origin:

Oceanographic research ship
1× a former trawler converted in the 1970 called Nour: (Stricken in 2002)

Armament unknown

Origin: (possibly)

Landing ship
1 × Polnocny-class landing ship

Armament
4 × Strela 2(SA-N-5) surface-to-air missile system
2 × 30 mm AK-230 air defence gun
2 × 140 mm Ogon 18-barreled rocket launcher

Origin:

Naval infrastructure

Naval bases in the 2011 Libyan civil war
 Khoms
 Benghazi
 Misrata
 Tobruk
 Tripoli
 Derna
 Sirte

Ship maintenance and repair facilities 

See also
 Libyan Coast Guard

References 

 Levie, Howard. Mine Warfare at Sea. Dordrecht, NL: Martinus Nijhoff, 1992.
 War machines encliclopedy, Limited publishing, in Italian version Armi da guerra.
 Annati Massimo, Al diavolo le mine!, RID magazine, Coop Riviera Ligure, Italy, June 2005.

External links

  Libyan Navy

 
Military of Libya
Navies by country
1962 establishments in Libya
Military units and formations established in 1962
First Libyan Civil War